At Home (stylized in lowercase) is a chain of home décor stores based in Plano, Texas that currently operates 250 stores in 40 states. The average store is 110,000 square feet. Each store offers up to 50,000 home products that range from furniture, mirrors, rugs, art and housewares to tabletop, patio and seasonal décor.

In August 2016, the company went public.

Lewis (Lee) Leo Bird III serves as Chairman of the Board and Chief Executive Officer for At Home. Bird joined the company in December 2012. Prior to this, Bird served as President of Nike Affiliates for Nike Inc., Chief Operating Officer of Gap, and Chief Financial Officer of Old Navy.

History
Founded in 1979 with one store in Schertz, Texas, the brand was created as Garden Ridge Pottery and was later renamed simply Garden Ridge.

Investment firm Three Cities Research became the largest shareholder of Garden Ridge in 1999. Garden Ridge filed for Chapter 11 bankruptcy protection in 2004. After the reorganization, the corporation emerged from Chapter 11 in 2005.

AEA Investors acquired Garden Ridge in October 2011.

In 2014, the company converted all stores to the At Home brand and floorplan, painting everything grey (from Garden Ridge's characteristic orange).

The company publicly filed an S-1 on September 4, 2015.

At Home underwent a rebranding project that included the previously stated name change and a store redesign. The rebranding project changed the use of orange color for advertising to a soft grey and blue. A house symbol stands in for the “o” in At Home, so there's no confusion about what's sold inside, CEO Lee Bird said. This investment cost around $20 million.

In July 2021, the company was acquired by Hellman & Friedman.

References

External links

 

Retail companies of the United States
Companies based in Plano, Texas
Retail companies established in 1979
1979 establishments in Texas
American companies established in 1979
Companies that filed for Chapter 11 bankruptcy in 2004
Home decor retailers
2016 initial public offerings
2021 mergers and acquisitions
Companies formerly listed on the New York Stock Exchange
Private equity portfolio companies